Gabriella Gatti (5 July 1908 – 22 October 2003) was an Italian operatic soprano, primarily based in Italy and associated with the Italian repertory.

Born Gabriella Pesci in Rome, where she studied voice and piano. 
She made her stage debut in 1934, at the Teatro dell'Opera di Roma in Monteverdi's Orfeo. Thereafter she quickly appeared in all the major opera houses throughout Italy, most often in Rome and Florence, but also sang at the Teatro alla Scala in Milan, from 1938 to 1947. She was admired in roles such as; Countess Almaviva, Semiramide, Mathilde, Desdemona, etc.

She sang Marie at the Italian premiere of Wozzeck in Rome, in 1942.

She can be heard in a few recordings, notably in Le nozze di Figaro, opposite Sesto Bruscantini, Alda Noni, Italo Tajo, and as Fenena in Nabucco.

Sources

 Grove Music Online, Rodolfo Celletti, Oxford University Press, April 2008.

1908 births
2003 deaths
Italian operatic sopranos
20th-century Italian women  opera singers
Singers from Rome